Jean Cabannes (born 12 August 1885 – died 31 October 1959) was a French physicist specialising in optics.

Education and career 
Cabannes studied at the Lycée de Nice and entered the École Normale Supérieure in 1906. From 1910 to 1914, Cabannes worked in the laboratory of Charles Fabry at Aix-Marseille University on the topic launched by Lord Rayleigh at the end of the 19th century of how gas molecules diffused light. In 1914 he showed that pure gases could scatter light. This was published in Comptes Rendus in 1915. (Please see reference.) His career was then interrupted for five years by World War I.

In 1919 Cabannes returned to Fabry's laboratory to complete his thesis, after which he moved to University of Montpellier, and later on to University of Paris. In 1925 he and Jean Dufay calculated the height of the ozone layer. Cabannes along with Pierre Daure and Yves Rocard were among the scientists who, in 1928, discovered that gases diffusing monochromatic light could also change their wavelength (the Cabannes-Daure effect).

This was identified independently by C. V. Raman and K. S. Krishnan in liquids, and by G. S. Landsberg and L. I. Mandelstam in crystals. Cabannes was among the candidates for the Nobel Prize in Physics of 1929 (proposed by Charles Fabry), which was awarded to de Broglie and the 1930 prize went to C. V. Raman.

Honors and awards 

In 1949 he was elected a member of l'Académie des Sciences. In 1924 he received the Prix Félix-Robin and in 1951 the first ever awarded Prix des Trois Physiciens from the Fondation de France.

Cabannes was the President of the Société astronomique de France (SAF) (French astronomical society), from 1951-1953.

The lunar crater Cabannes was named after him.

Personal life 
He was married to a daughter of Eugène Fabry (1856–1944), brother of Charles Fabry, and was the father of four children, among whom was the mathematician Henri Cabannes.

References

J. Cabannes, Comptes Rendus, vol. 160, pp. 62–63 (1915).

1885 births
1959 deaths
French physicists
Scientists from Marseille
École Normale Supérieure alumni
Members of the French Academy of Sciences
Academic staff of the University of Montpellier
Academic staff of the University of Paris
Aix-Marseille University alumni
Optical physicists